The following are the national records in track cycling in Switzerland maintained by Swiss Cycling.

Men
Key to tables:

Women

References
General
Swiss Track Cycling Records 15 October 2022 updated
Specific

External links
Swiss Cycling web site

Swiss
Records
Track cycling
track cycling